Katie Boulter was the defending champion, but chose not to participate.

Heather Watson won the title, defeating Zarina Diyas in the final, 7–6(7–1), 7–6(7–4).

Seeds

Draw

Finals

Top half

Bottom half

References

Main Draw

Fukuoka International Women's Cup - Singles